It has been proposed that Romania withdraw from the European Union (EU), this sometimes being known as Roexit or Romexit (with both being portmanteaus of "Romania" and "exit"). Romania, which joined the EU in 2007, is usually regarded as different from its other more typically illiberal and populist Eastern European neighbours members of the organization.

History
In 2018, Daniel Dragomir, suggested in Facebook that Romania should leave the European Union (EU). Dragomir, a nationalist against the anti-corruption policies of the country and a former Romanian Intelligence Service (SRI) member, stated that EU membership was affecting Romanian national sovereignty and that Brussels was "robbing from us". This statement has been proven to be false, as Romania then received more money than it gave to the EU. He said this after Frans Timmermans, Vice-President of the European Commission, criticized the justice reforms that were then taking place in Romania. Dragomir published a list of 10 reasons why the country should leave the EU.

Some political parties in Romania advocate the proposal as well. An example is Noua Dreaptă, a far-right party, opposes Romanian presence in the EU and NATO.

However, some pro-EU politicians like Corina Crețu, a former European Commissioner for Regional Policy, criticized the idea, calling it a "luxury" and listing several moments in which the EU has helped the country. Victor Negrescu, the then Romanian Minister Delegate for European Affairs, said the idea is not taken into account at political level in the country and that it has only been created to "stir controversy". He instead advocated for the integration of Romania in European politics.

In December 2020, the soft Eurosceptic party Alliance for the Union of Romanians (AUR), which has been described as far-right, entered the Romanian Parliament for the first time and became the 4th largest party in the country, although it is unclear whether it supports leaving the EU or not. In 2021, the senator Diana Iovanovici Șoșoacă, a former AUR member then affiliated with the Romanian Nationhood Party (PNR), expressed her support for a Romanian withdrawal from the EU. Furthermore, some examples of non-politicians supporting this include Romanian actor , who expressed his support for the withdrawal of Romania from the EU in 2022.

Public opinion
Euroscepticism is generally not very popular among Romanians. According to a poll from 2015, 65.6% of Romanians thought that joining the EU had been beneficial for their country. This represented a very notable change compared to a 2013 poll; only 35% saw the EU as beneficial. Furthermore, 58% agreed with the adoption of the euro in 2015 compared to 35% in 2013. Later, in a poll conducted in 2022, 71.1% of respondents said they would not vote to leave the EU compared with 25.2% who would, which again represented an increase of support to the EU among Romanians.

References

External links
 

Proposals in Romania
Portmanteaus
Romania and the European Union
Withdrawal from the European Union
Euroscepticism in Romania
Public policy proposals